Tioconazole is an antifungal medication of the imidazole class used to treat infections caused by a fungus or yeast. It is marketed under the brand names Trosyd and Gyno-Trosyd (Pfizer, now Johnson & Johnson). Tioconazole ointments serve to treat women's vaginal yeast infections. They are available in one day doses, as opposed to the 7-day treatments commonly used in the past.

Tioconazole topical (skin) preparations are also available for ringworm, jock itch, athlete's foot, and tinea versicolor or "sun fungus".

It was patented in 1975 and approved for medical use in 1982.



Side effects
Side effects of vaginal tioconazole may include temporary burning itching, or irritation of the vagina. Vaginal swelling or redness, difficulty or burning during urination, headache, abdominal pain, and upper respiratory tract infection have been reported by people using tioconazole. These side effects may be only temporary, and do not normally interfere with the patient's comfort enough to outweigh the result.

Synthesis
Antimycotic imidazole derivative.

A displacement reaction between 1-(2,4-dichlorophenyl)-2-(1H-imidazol-1-yl)ethanol and 2-chloro-3-(chloromethyl)thiophene is performed.

References

21-Hydroxylase inhibitors
Aromatase inhibitors
Chlorobenzenes
CYP17A1 inhibitors
Phenylethanolamine ethers
Imidazole antifungals
Lanosterol 14α-demethylase inhibitors
Thiophenes